Ngahuia Te Awekotuku  (born 1949) is a New Zealand academic specialising in Māori cultural issues and a lesbian activist. In 1972, she was famously denied a visa to visit the United States on the basis of her sexuality.

Biography
Te Awekotuku is descended from Te Arawa, Tūhoe and Waikato iwi.

As a student she was a member of Ngā Tamatoa at the University of Auckland, . Her Master of Arts thesis was on Janet Frame and her PhD on the effects of tourism  on the Te Arawa people.

Te Awekotuku has worked across the heritage, culture and academic sectors as a curator, lecturer, researcher and activist. Her areas of research interest include gender issues, museums, body modification, power and powerlessness, spirituality and ritual. She has been curator of ethnology at the Waikato Museum; lecturer in art history at Auckland University, and professor of Māori studies at Victoria University of Wellington. She was Professor of Research and Development at Waikato University. She and Marilyn Waring contributed the piece "Foreigners in our own land" to the 1984 anthology Sisterhood Is Global: The International Women's Movement Anthology, edited by Robin Morgan. Although now retired, she continues to write and mentor students.

Visitor's permit denial 

In 1972, Te Awekotuku was denied a visitor's permit to the USA on the grounds that she was a homosexual. Publicity around the incident was a catalyst in the formation of gay liberation groups in New Zealand. This may have been related to a TV interview she gave in 1971, in which she described herself as a 'sapphic woman'.

Research into tā moko
Her 2007 (re-published in 2011) book Mau Moko: the world of Maori tattoo, co-authored with Linda Waimarie Nikora, was the product of a five-year long research project conducted by the Māori and Psychology Research Unit at Waikato University, funded by a Marsden Fund grant.

Te Awekotuku took a moko kauae (facial moko) to mark the death of Te Arikinui Dame te Atairangikaahu in 2006.

Research into the Māori way of death

In 2009 Te Awekotuku and Linda Waimarie Nikora received a $950,000 Marsden Fund grant as lead researchers in the Māori and Psychology Research Unit at Waikato University for the research project 'Apakura: the Maori way of death'. A further $250,000 was received from the Nga Pae o te Maramatanga National Institute of Research Excellence to explore past and present practices around tangihanga.

Recognition 
In the 2010 New Year Honours, Te Awekotuku was appointed a Member of the New Zealand Order of Merit for services to Māori culture. In 2017, she won an Auckland Museum Medal. Also in 2017, Te Awekotuku was selected as one of the Royal Society Te Apārangi's "150 women in 150 words", celebrating the contributions of women to knowledge in New Zealand.

Selected publications

 He tikanga whakaaro: Research ethics in the Maori community: A discussion paper Ministry of Māori Affairs

On art and artists

We will become ill if we stop weaving. From Mana Whina Maori Selected writings on Maori Women's art, culture and politics. Republished in ATE Journal of Māori Art, 2020, vol 2 pp. 90—103.
E ngaa uri whakatupu - weaving legacies : Dame Rangimarie Hetet and Diggeress Te Kanawa, Hamilton: Waikato Museum Te Whare Taonga o Waikato, 2015. 
'Traditions endure : Five Maori Painters at Auckland Art Gallery', Art New Zealand, Winter 2014, no. 150, pp. 58–61.
'A glorious tradition', Art New Zealand, Winter 2003, no.103.
Unveiling our hidden treasures : the Seventh Pacific Festival of Arts 1996;', Art New Zealand, Summer 1996/1997, no. 81, pp. 42–45,84.
'Forgiving, but never forgetting : Shared Visions at the Auckland City Art Gallery', Art New Zealand, Winter 1996, no. 79, pp. 74–77.
 'He Take Ano: Another Take - Conversations with Lisa Reihana', Art New Zealand, Spring 1993, no. 68, pp. 84–87
 'Kura Te Waru Rewiri', Art New Zealand, Spring 1993, no. 68, pp. 91–93
 Mana wahine Maori: Selected writings on Maori women's art, culture and politics, Auckland: New Women's Press, 1991. 
'Art and the spirit', New Zealand Geographic, Jan/Mar 1990, no. 5, pp. 93–97.
'Mats of the Pacific', Art New Zealand, Spring 1989, no. 52, pp..88-90
'Te whakahoutanga o Te Winika (The restoration of Te Winika)', New Zealand Listener, 28 November 1987, p. 67.
'Ngahuia Te Awekotuku in conversation with Elizabeth Eastmond and Priscilla Pitts’, Antic, no. 1, 1986.

On tā moko

 'Tā Moko: Māori Tattoo', in Goldie, (1997) exhibition catalogue, Auckland: Auckland City Art Gallery and David Bateman, pp. 108–114.
 'More than Skin Deep', in Barkan, E. and Bush, R. (eds.), Claiming the Stone: Naming the Bones: Cultural Property and the Negotiation of National and Ethnic Identity (2002) Los Angeles: Getty Press, pp. 243–254.
Ta Moko: Culture, body modification, and the psychology of identity, paper given at the Proceedings of the National Māori Graduates of Psychology Symposium 2002.
 Ngahuia Te Awekotuku, with Linda Waimarie Nikora, Mohi Rua, your face: wearing Moko – Maori facial marking in today’s world, paper given at Tatau/Tattoo: Embodied art and cultural exchange conference, Victoria University of Wellington, 21–22 August 2003.
 Ngahuia Te Awekotuku, with Linda Waimarie Nikora, Mohi Rua and Rolinda Karapu, Mau moko : the world of Māori tattoo, Auckland: Penguin Books, 2011.

On death in Maori culture
Tess Moeke-Maxwell, Linda Waimarie Nikora, and Ngahuia Te Awekotuku, 'Manaakitanga: Ethical research with Māori who are dying', in M. Agee, T. McIntosh, P. Culbertson, & C. Makasiale (eds.), Pacific Identities and Well-Being - Cross Cultural Perspectives, London: Routledge, 2003, pp. 188–203.
 Vincent Malcolm-Buchanan, Lina Waimarie Nikora and Ngahuia Te Awekotuku, Cloaked in Life and Death: Korowai, kaitiaki and tangihanga, MAI Journal, vol. 1, no. 1, 2012.
 Tess Moeke-Maxwell, Linda Waimarie Nikora, and Ngahuia Te Awekotuku, 'End-of-life care and Māori whānau resilience', MAI Journal, vol. 3, no. 2, pp. 140–152.

Further information
Interview with Ngahuia Te Awekotuku, 'Nine to Noon programme, RNZ National, 25 June 2013
Ngahuia Te Awekotuku: Sustaining the art of moko presentation for the Royal Society of New Zealand, June 2014
 Te Awekotuku, Ngahuia. Routledge International Encyclopedia of Queer Culture, 2012 page 553.

References 

New Zealand LGBT rights activists
New Zealand Māori academics
1949 births
Te Arawa people
Ngāi Tūhoe people
Waikato Tainui people
New Zealand curators
New Zealand women academics
New Zealand lesbian writers
Living people
Place of birth missing (living people)
Date of birth missing (living people)
University of Auckland alumni
Academic staff of the Victoria University of Wellington
Academic staff of the University of Waikato
New Zealand women curators
Members of the New Zealand Order of Merit
Māori studies academics
New Zealand non-fiction writers
20th-century New Zealand women writers
New Zealand Māori women academics
21st-century New Zealand women writers
Recipients of Marsden grants